Lai  or LAI may refer to:

Abbreviations
 Austrian Latin America Institute (Österreichisches Lateinamerika-Institut)
 Latin American Idol, TV series
 La Trobe Institute, Melbourne, Australia
 Leaf area index, leaf area of a crop or vegetation per unit ground area
 League against Imperialism, transnational anti-imperialist organization in the interwar period
 Liga Atlética Interuniversitaria de Puerto Rico
 Location Area Identity

Places
 Lai (state) (萊), 6th-century BC state in present-day Shandong, China
Bolyu language, also known as Lai
 Laï, city in Chad
 Lai, Iran (disambiguation), places in Iran
 Lai, village in Lum Choar, Cambodia
 Lai, Romansch name for Lenzerheide, a village in Switzerland
 Lannion – Côte de Granit Airport

Surname
 Francis Lai (1932–2018), French composer
 Valentino Lai (born 1984), Swedish football player
 Lai (surname) 黎丶賴, Chinese surname
 Lí (surname 黎), Lai in Cantonese

Other
 Battle of Lai, during World War I
 Lai people, ethnic group of Mizoram, North East India
 Lai languages
 Lai (poetic form) or Lay, song form in medieval France

See also
Lais (disambiguation)

Language and nationality disambiguation pages